Jeepneys, sometimes called jeeps, are minibus-like public utility vehicles, serving as the most popular means of public transportation in the Philippines. They are known for their crowded seating and kitsch decorations, which have become a widespread symbol of Philippine culture and art. A Sarao jeepney was exhibited at the Philippine pavilion at the 1964 New York World's Fair as a national image for the Filipinos.

Jeepneys originate from the American colonial period share taxis known as auto calesas, commonly shortened to "AC". These evolved to modified imported cars with attached carriages in the 1930s which served as cheap passenger utility vehicles in Manila. These vehicles were mostly destroyed in World War II. The need for replacement transport vehicles led to the use of U.S. military jeeps left over from the war, which became the template for the modern jeepney. The word "jeepney" is a portmanteau of post-World War II "jeep" and pre-war "jitney", both words common slang in the popular vernacular of the era.

An estimated 600,000 drivers nationwide depend on driving jeepneys for their livelihood.

History 

From the American colonial period up to shortly after World War II, jeepneys were known as "auto calesa" (or "AC" for short), named after the horse-drawn calesas of Manila, or simply "jitney" or "baby bus." The term "auto calesa" was first attested in 1910, and originally referred to relatively cheap imported cars that were used as share taxis by local drivers for ₱2 an hour. The first automobile to be modified for seating more passengers was introduced in 1932 by a Filipino entrepreneur, using cheap imported German DKW vehicles with side-entry carriages attached. These were operated by the DKW-AC Company.

By the mid-1930s, Emil Bachrach, a Russian American Jewish entrepreneur in the Philippines (who also owned the Ford Motor Co. franchise in the Philippines, as well as Manila's first bus company), started the Bachrach Motor Company (BMC). They began manufacturing similar vehicles known as the BMC-AC. Unlike the DKW-ACs, they had a back-entry carriage-style (similar to the Visayan tartanilla rather than the calesa) that was joined seamlessly with the chassis. It seated two people on each side. The automobile used were cheap imported British Austin 7s and later on, American Bantams, both of which are the direct precursors of the Jeep. They later expanded to seat eight to ten people, but were still much shorter than modern jeepneys. Most of these vehicles were destroyed in World War II.

When American troops began to leave the Philippines at the end of World War II, hundreds of surplus Jeeps were sold or given to the Filipinos. An American soldier named Harry Stonehill was involved in the disposal of military surplus, and reportedly created a black market for the surplus including jeeps. 

The Jeeps were stripped down and altered locally: metal roofs were added for shade; and the vehicles decorated in vibrant colours with chrome-plated ornaments on the sides and hood. The back part was reconfigured with two long parallel benches with passengers facing each other to accommodate more passengers. The size, length and passenger capacity has increased as it evolved through the years. In assembly-built jeepneys (notably those built by Sarao Motors and Francisco Motors), the passenger capacity reached a maximum of fourteen to eighteen (including two up front). These high-capacity jeepneys were the first versions to be referred to as "Public Utility Jeepneys" (PUJ) or "passenger-type" jeeps. The non-extended, original-seat configuration jeeps were labeled "owners", short for "owner-type" jeeps, and are used non-commercially. To distinguish it from those used as public transportation, the term "owner" is used. The original jeepneys were refurbished military Jeeps by Willys and Ford. Modern jeepneys are now produced with engines and other parts from Japan or South Korea.

The jeepney rapidly emerged as a popular and creative way to re-establish inexpensive public transportation, much of which had been destroyed during World War II. Recognizing the widespread use of these vehicles, the Philippine government began to regulate their use. Drivers now must have special driver's licenses. Routes are regulated and prices are fixed fares. Illegal (unfranchised) operators are referred to as "colorum" operations.

Jeepneys have been reported to be exported to Papua New Guinea to replace buses and vans that are too costly to import. 4,000 jeepneys were exported to Papua New Guinea in 2004 with considerations to export them to Guam, India and Vietnam.

Recently, the jeepney industry has faced threats to its survival. Most of the larger builders have gone bankrupt or have switched to manufacturing other products, with the smaller builders forced to go out of business. Passenger jeepneys are also facing increasing restrictions and regulations for pollution control, as they consume much fuel. A 2017 study published in a Metro Manila newspaper compared the fuel use of a 16-passenger jeepney to a 54-passenger air-conditioned bus and found that the fuel consumption for both was the same, while no data was given for private vehicles.

The planned construction of bus rapid transit (BRT) systems in Manila and Cebu might lead to the removal of jeepneys.

During the COVID-19 pandemic in the Philippines, public buses and jeepneys were subject to strict lockdown measures that affected the livelihoods of those in the transport sector. Jeepney drivers struggled with the effects of lockdowns and other disease containment measures. In 2020, jeepney drivers filed a case with the Supreme Court against the government's COVID-19 policies, which they argue were prejudicial to their livelihood and deprived them of income to provide for their families.

Fleet modernization 

In 2016, the Department of Transportation and Communications imposed an age limit on jeepneys of 15 years, with older jeepneys starting to be phased out. Many jeepney operators oppose the phase-out, and George San Mateo, leader of the "No to Jeepney Phaseout" Coalition, called the modernization program "corrupt". Leyte Representative Martin Romualdez urged the Land Transportation Franchising and Regulatory Board (LTFRB) to drop its jeepney modernization program. As part of the PUV modernization program all new and existing vehicles must be fitted with a tap card system which allows commuters to pay for their trip. After multiple failed attempts at implementation and crippling technical issues surrounding the existing Beep Card many of the proposed systems were rejected by the Department of Transportation (DOTr). In 2018, Panta Transportation begun developing the Panta Transportation Network which utilises advanced RFID card technology in the form of Panta Cards. The cards enable value to be loaded onto the card, as well as allowing the journey details to be recorded and the appropriate fare deducted from the stored value on the card. It is designed so that passengers can tap on and off any services whenever they travel through the public transport network. The system received positive media coverage and reviews from jeepney operators calling the system "The future of transportation in the Philippines". The Panta Transportation Network had then started to be recognised by Isuzu, Hino, and Star 8 to be installed on over 100,000 jeepneys by the end of 2019 with further plans to have completely rolled out the system on over 250,000 vehicles across Metro Manila by early 2020. Further talks with the DOTr have suggested that the Panta Transportation Network will work alongside other providers of contactless fare collection system for public transport services in the Philippines.

Design 

Body designs of jeepneys vary by region. Some are plainly colored, while others can use massive variety. They either use sheet metal or stainless steel as body panels. Some jeepneys can be decorated with stickers or spray paint, with designs consisting of caricatures, illustrations or pictures inspired from popular culture, such as actors and actresses, cartoon, anime, comic, game, or movie characters, abstract designs and lines, religious icons and others.

In the central island of Cebu, the bulk of jeepneys are built from second-hand Japanese trucks, originally intended for cargo. These are euphemistically known as "surplus trucks". Popular jeepney manufacturers in Cebu are Chariot and RDAK, known for its "flat-nosed" jeepneys made from surplus Suzuki Carry (also known as multicab) and Isuzu Elf trucks, which are no longer in use in Japan owing to road tax and obsolescence in their country of origin. These are equipped with high-powered sound systems, racing themes, and are said to be bigger and taller than those in Manila.

In Bulacan, particularly in the city of Malolos, shorter extended "owner" jeeps called "Karatig" are used for short-distance, inter-city transportation. The size varies, with approximately 3 meters of passenger space which is longer than and can seat at least twice as many passengers as private-use "owner" jeeps. The "Karatigs" are less ergonomic and fuel-efficient compared to the more standard-size public utility jeeps dominating the rest of the country. Despite this awkward size, "Karatig" jeeps' unique and even "cute" size has become an icon contributing to the culture and experience of Bulacan public transportation.

Nelson-type jeepneys are manufactured in Davao City and are known there as "uso-uso". The designs of these jeepneys are very different from the traditional style. These jeepneys feature modern front grille and body designs, lowered ride height, and industrial quality paint jobs. Newer models of Nelson-type jeepneys feature chrome wheels, equipped with radial tubeless tires. They are almost always equipped with a powerful stereo system, so they are often referred to as "mobile discos."

Many manufacturers are moving to build modern-looking jeepneys such as Hummer and Jeep Wrangler Rubicon lookalikes and oversized van-style passenger jeepneys with headlights, hoods, bumpers and other components salvaged from AUVs and sport utility vehicles like the Honda CR-V or the Toyota Tamaraw. In Iloilo City, jeepneys called passad are known for bearing a resemblance to sedans or pickup trucks, with the front fascia taken off an existing SUV or AUV. The vehicle's body has a much lower profile which resembles more of a sedan chassis with an elongated body.

In the Cordillera Administrative Region, especially in Baguio City and Benguet province, they have jeeps fitted with truck wheels, or jeeps based from a heavy truck platform, frame and engine. The same goes in other parts of the Philippines with unpaved roads.

2nd-generation jeepneys 

Fully assembled with refurbished engines, some also have air-conditioning units, most popularly in Makati. Most of these jeepneys have radically expanded passenger capacities, and are often flamboyant and noisy. Many jeepneys from this generation are notorious for belching smoke and almost all run on diesel fuel, though very rarely with gasoline and LPG.

Passenger jeepneys from this generation and beyond may employ tailgates especially if they traverse expressways. These are usually rigged mechanically to be controlled from the driver side in lieu of electronic locking systems.

3rd-generation jeepneys 

Two kinds of 3rd-generation jeepneys have surfaced over the years: Modernized jeepneys and truck- and van-based jeepneys.

Modernized jeepneys are manufactured using new engine components and are built with air-conditioning, particularly with recent Euro 4 engine standards imposed in the country. Though some keep the traditional body of the contemporary jeepney, many of these closely resemble a minibus. Their doors may be situated at the side, or at the front, with doors functioning like that of an actual bus.

Cab/chassis variants of jeepneys are based on pick-up trucks and van platforms wherein local coachbuilders assemble rear bodies for passenger and cargo hauling purposes. Their doors are situated at the back as a tailgate, and usually have parallel bench seats that can be lifted for more cargo space and air conditioning that may be standard or optional to some car manufacturers. These kind of vehicles are referred to as FB-type vans.

Early examples of the modern-type of jeepney include the Toyota Tamaraw, Ford Fiera, and the Mitsubishi Cimmaron (Which predates the Tamaraw and Fiera by a whole decade, introduced as far back as 1961) which had parallel benches offered standard by their respective manufacturers. They were introduced back in the 1970s and was an alternative to the aging jeepney. Modern examples include the pick-up based Toyota Hilux, ISUZU IPV and Mitsubishi L200 to the van-based Hyundai H100, Mitsubishi L300, Kia K-2500 Karga, Isuzu Traviz and even truck-based Mitsubishi Fuso Canter, Hino Dutro and Isuzu N-Series to name a few.

Although they are often seen as commercial van rather than an actual jeepney, they are popularly used as a school bus, delivery vehicles, and other modes of public transportation, mainly UV Express, though used sparingly in comparison to actual commercial vans such as the Toyota HiAce or the Nissan Urvan.

"Modern" jeepneys 

They are an updated version of the 3rd-generation jeepneys but with additional regulatory standards, such as standard seating, expanded vehicle height, CCTV, fare collection system (traditional, Panta and/or Beep), speed limiters, GPS, and Wi-Fi. Many brand new jeeps built in this generation are usually issued to transport cooperatives and are usually manufactured by major vehicle manufacturers, though modern jeepneys made by coachbuilders of such have been proposed and/or are in existence. However, they will have to adhere to standards as mentioned. Many of the modern jeepneys inherit the design and aesthetics of a truck van (such as having a hoodless front, due to their industrially manufactured nature) and less of the traditional jeep, making their aesthetics look more of a bus.

There are at least 3 classifications categorized by manufacturers, Class 1 is based on vans or microvans chassis cabs. Like 3rd-generation jeepneys, they have rear bodies made by coachbuilders, but the only difference is that they are taller in height and their passenger doors are now situated on the side. Class 2 and 3 are based on Medium-duty trucks (Often converted to a bus) or an actual Minibus.

Class 1 and 2 PUVs have their seating configuration facing sidewards while Class 3 are front-facing seat configuration. For truck vans and minibusses, vehicle manufacturers/coachbuilders can sometimes offer both Class 2 and Class 3 configurations on their models.

E-jeepneys 
Local automobile parts manufacturers are now planning the production of electric jeepneys. Electric jeepneys are now widely deployed in several parts of Metro Manila and in some provinces, either as a staple transportation that completely replaces conventional jeepneys or as service vehicle. The deployments were in response to calls for reduced greenhouse gas emissions and the fluctuations in oil prices. These E-jeepneys will also be fitted with Panta Card reader as part of the transportation unification set out by the DOTr. E-jeepneys have come into economical question as the average cost per kwh electricity in the Philippines is unsustainable for owner operators. However, considering the uncertainty in diesel prices, E-jeepneys seems more economical in the long-run compared to diesel-fueled jeepneys.

Advantages and disadvantages 

The jeepney is the cheapest way to commute in the Philippines. Because of its open rear door design, picking up and dropping off is easy for both passengers and drivers, they can stop anywhere unlike buses. But also because of this convenience, some jeepney drivers are a source of traffic congestion by indiscriminately loading and unloading passengers in the middle of the street, blocking traffic and risking the safety of some passengers. Some drivers engage in practices such as jostling over passengers, blocking other jeepneys to get passengers in the middle of the lane and trip-cutting (not completing the route, dropping off passengers if there are less than three to return to the jeepney stand and wait for a new set of passengers as it is not profitable for them to continue the route). Hence, some people are requesting that this mode of transportation be phased out, which is also blamed as a major source of air pollution in cities.

Jeepneys are often mechanically unsound, and not at all roadworthy, with their balding tires, crabbing and yawing from distorted subframes, with poor emissions. Their longitudinal seating and lack of any seat-belts raises serious safety concerns for the passengers. The low height of the saloon, and the extended roof above the driver, make visibility very poor. The high step at the back and the restricted height make entry and exit difficult. In addition, they have little space for shopping bags.

In response to the cons of the jeepneys, a massive modernization program has been launched that addresses the pitfalls that were long overdue for correction. Newly manufactured jeepneys, such as e-jeepneys and modernized diesel jeepneys, are required to have at least a Euro 4-compliant engine or an electric engine and must contain safety features like speed limiters, accessibility features like ramps and seatbelts, closed-circuit television cameras, Wi-Fi and USB ports, GPS, and a dashboard camera. Motor manufacturers such as Toyota (and their truck subsidiary Hino), Mitsubishi (and their truck subsidiary Fuso), Isuzu, Hyundai, and even some Chinese truck brands such as Foton presented their own prototypes of the modernized jeepneys.

In popular culture 

When season 5 of the American reality TV show The Amazing Race came to the Philippines in 2004, a segment of jeepney manufacturing was one of the tasks part of the eleventh leg. The episode, which was broadcast the same year, was shot at the Malagueña Motors factory.
A BBC television program in 2011 called Toughest Place to be a … Bus Driver, a London bus driver goes to Manila and had to experience driving a jeepney around the busy streets of the city.
In the first season of Canadian reality TV show Don't Drive Here in 2014, host Andrew Younghusband traveled to Manila with the goal of safely driving a jeepney through Manila as his final day challenge for the trip. After driving nearly 2/3rds of his 15 km route through Manila, he failed the challenge after accidentally switching the ignition off with his knee whilst in an intersection, and having the light turn red as he restarted the engine and proceeded forward (thus running the red light).
In honor of the 2019 Asia Challenge being hosted in Manila, Tamiya released a special edition Mini 4WD kit called the "Dyipne."
In 2020, Hot Wheels released a new casting called the "Road Bandit", which is based on the jeepney.
In April of 2022, Toro Y Moi released his seventh studio album, MAHAL with the cover featuring a custom built (working) jeepney in front of the Golden Gate Bridge in San Francisco's Bay Area.
One of the host city logos for the 2023 FIBA Basketball World Cup, in particular the Manila host city logo, features a jeepney.
In the BBC series Full Circle with Michael Palin, the host drives a jeepney while in the Philippines.
The Cable Channel, Jeepney TV, is named after this vehicle.

See also 

 Public Utility Vehicle Modernization Program
 GET COMET
 Customised buses
 Chiva bus
 Dollar van/Jitney
 Jeepito
 Minibus
 Midibus
 Multicab
 Songthaew
 Tap tap
 Dala dala
 Boda boda
 Colectivo
 Matatu
 Tro tro
 Weyala
 Pesero
 Public light bus
 Marshrutka
 Truck bus
 Angkot
 Dolmuş

Notes

References

External links 

Share taxis
Public transportation in the Philippines
Road transportation in the Philippines
Decorated vehicles